Hiw (sometimes spelled Hiu) is an Oceanic language spoken on the island of Hiw, in the Torres Islands of Vanuatu. With about 280 speakers, Hiw is considered endangered.

Hiw is distinct from Lo-Toga, the other language of the Torres group. All Hiw speakers are bilingual in Bislama, and most also speak Lo-Toga.

Name
The language is named after the island.

Phonology

Vowels
Hiw has 9 phonemic vowels. These are all short monophthongs :

The three central vowels  are all rounded.

 becomes a glide  whenever it's followed by another vowel.

Consonants
Hiw has 14 consonants.

All plosives are voiceless. Hiw is the only Austronesian language whose consonant inventory includes a prestopped velar lateral approximant ; this complex segment is Hiw's only native liquid. Historically, this complex segment was a voiced alveolar trill  (which is why it is written as r̄). The voiced alveolar trill, spelt as r, appears in recent loanwords. In some other, perhaps older, loanwords, alveolar trills have been borrowed as velar laterals.

Stress
Stress is predictable in Hiw, except in the case of words which only contain . 

Primary stress falls on the last syllable in a word that does not contain . For example:  'moon',  'maybe'. In the case of words whose only vowel is schwa, stress is unpredictable: e.g.  'pandanus leaf', . These are the only words which may have stressed schwa.

Polysyllabic words have secondary stress, which falls on every second syllable from the primary stressed syllable, going leftwards. For example:  'speak'.

Phonotactics
The syllable structure of Hiw is CCVC, where the only obligatory element is V: e.g.  'throw';  'star';  'dolphin';  'tie'.

Hiw allows consonant gemination, word-medially and initially. These geminated consonants can be analyzed as CC consonant clusters in which both consonants happen to be identical. An example of gemination is in  'buy' vs  'hot'. Consonants and vowels may also be lengthened for expressive purposes, for example:  ‘it’s heavy’ becomes  ‘it’s so heavy!’.

Hiw's phonology follows the Sonority Sequencing Principle, with the following language-specific sonority hierarchy: 

In syllable onsets, C may not be more sonorous than C. Fricatives and plosives are not distinguished with regard to sonority. 

Even though  is always pronounced as an approximant, it is best treated as an obstruent with regards to sonority: this interpretation accounts for words like  'small', which would otherwise constitute a sonority reversal.

Phonological evidence shows that  patterns as a liquid, more sonorous than nasals but less sonorous than the glide . Unlike the obstruents,  cannot be followed by a nasal. However, it can come after a nasal, as in  ‘wrath’. The only consonant found after  is  - e.g.  ‘sweep’.

Grammar
Hiw has a similar grammatical structure to the other living Torres–Banks languages.

In terms of lexical flexibility, Hiw has been assessed to be “grammatically flexible”, but “lexically rigid”. The vast majority of the language's lexemes belongs to just one word class (noun, adjective, verb, adverb…); yet each of those word classes is compatible with a large number of syntactic functions.

The language presents various forms of verb serialization.

Its system of personal pronouns contrasts clusivity, and distinguishes three numbers (singular, dual, plural).

Together with its neighbour Lo-Toga, Hiw has developed a rich system of verbal number, whereby certain verbs alternate their root depending on the number of their main participant. Hiw has 33 such pairs of suppletive verbs, which is the highest number recorded so far among the world's languages.

Spatial reference in Hiw is based on a system of geocentric (absolute) directionals. That space system is largely reminiscent of the one widespread among Oceanic languages, yet also shows some innovations that make it unique.

References

Bibliography

 

 

 .

External links
 Linguistic map of north Vanuatu, showing the range of Hiw.
 Audio recordings in the Hiw language, in open access, by A. François (Pangloss Collection).

Languages of Vanuatu
Banks–Torres languages
Torba Province
Hiw Island
Endangered Austronesian languages
Definitely endangered languages